Athanasios Rotimi "Thanasis" Antetokounmpo (born Adetokunbo; July 18, 1992) is a Greek-Nigerian professional basketball player for the Milwaukee Bucks of the National Basketball Association (NBA).  Listed at 6 feet and 7 inches, he plays the small forward and power forward positions. He is the older brother of two-time NBA MVP Giannis Antetokounmpo as well as Kostas Antetokounmpo and Alex Antetokounmpo. He and Giannis won a championship together with the Bucks in 2021.

Early career
Antetokounmpo was born in Athens, Greece, the second of five boys produced by his parents, Charles and Veronica Antetokounmpo. 
Antetokounmpo began playing youth club basketball with the junior teams of Filathlitikos, in 2008. He then played with the senior men's team of Filathlitikos, in the semi-professional levels of the Greek fourth division (2010–11 season), and the Greek third division (2011–12 season).

Professional career

Filathlitikos (2011–2013)
In 2012, Antetokounmpo began his professional level career with Filathlitikos, of the Greek third division, after previously playing with the club in the Greek minor leagues. During the 2012–13 Greek 2nd Division season with Filathlitikos, he averaged 12.2 points, 4.9 rebounds, 1.0 assists, 1.1 steals, and 1.0 blocks per game. He was selected by the coaches to play in the 2013 Greek All-Star Game as a special participant, even though he was not actually selected as an all-star, and competed in the slam dunk contest as players from the second division are eligible to compete in the dunk competition.

After originally declaring for the 2013 NBA draft, he withdrew from the draft on June 17, 2013, along with 17 other players, on the day of the withdrawal deadline. He had originally entered the draft with his younger brother Giannis.

He played four games for Filathlitikos in the 2013–14 Greek A2 League season. In a round 2 game against Ermis Lagkada on October 19, 2013. He recorded 15 points, 8 rebounds, 1 assist and 1 steal in his team's 76–69 win.

Delaware 87ers (2013–2014)
On November 1, 2013, Antetokounmpo was selected by the Delaware 87ers with the ninth overall pick in the 2013 NBA Development League Draft. On November 23, 2013, in his D-League debut, Antetokounmpo recorded 14 points, 2 rebounds, and 2 assists, in a 117–106 loss to the Canton Charge. He also competed at the 2014 NBA D-League Slam Dunk Contest.

During the 2013–14 NBA Development League season, he averaged 12.0 points, 4.3 rebounds, 2.1 assists, 1.2 steals and 1.3 blocks in 50 games. On May 1, 2014, he was named to the 2014 NBA D-League All-Defensive third team.

Westchester Knicks (2014–2016)

On June 26, 2014, Antetokounmpo was selected with the 51st overall pick in the 2014 NBA draft by the New York Knicks. He later joined the Knicks for the 2014 NBA Summer League where he averaged 3.0 points and 1.8 rebounds in five games. On November 3, 2014, he was acquired by the Westchester Knicks. On April 22, 2015, he was named to the 2015 NBA D-League All-Defensive second team. In 47 games for Westchester, he averaged 13.9 points, 6.2 rebounds, 1.7 assists, 1.7 steals, and 1.7 blocks per game.

In July 2015, Antetokounmpo re-joined the New York Knicks for the 2015 NBA Summer League where he averaged 6.4 points, 1.8 rebounds and 1.2 blocks in five games. On August 7, 2015, he signed with the Knicks, only to be waived by the team on October 23, after appearing in three preseason games. Later that month, he returned to the Westchester Knicks.

New York Knicks (2016) 
On January 29, 2016, Antetokounmpo signed a 10-day contract with the New York Knicks. He made his NBA debut later that night, scoring two points in two minutes of action against the Phoenix Suns.

Return to Westchester (2016) 
On February 8, 2016, New York decided not to renew Antetokounmpo's contract, and the following day, he returned to Westchester.

Andorra (2016–2017)
On August 8, 2016, Antetokounmpo signed with MoraBanc Andorra of the Liga ACB. He played an instrumental role as his team qualified for the first time in 22 years to the ACB playoffs, where they were eliminated in the quarterfinals by Real Madrid. He averaged 7.3 points and 3.8 rebounds per game during regular season, before raising his contribution to 12.7 points and 4.7 rebounds in the playoffs. The Spanish basketball magazine Gigantes del Basket awarded Antetokounmpo with their 2017 "Top 5 Trophy", which goes to the Liga ACB "Most Spectacular Player of the Year".

Panathinaikos (2017–2019)
On July 11, 2017, Antetokounmpo returned to Greece and signed a two-year deal with the EuroLeague giants Panathinaikos, of Greece's top-tier level Greek Basket League. He was named the MVP of the 2018 Greek All-Star Game. In June 2018, Antetokounmpo won the Greek League championship with Panathinaikos, after beating Olympiacos in the league's finals, after a five-game series. He was named the Greek League's Most Spectacular Player, of the 2017–18 season.
On February 17, 2019, he won the Greek Cup title after Panathinaikos defeated PAOK (79:73) in the big final, held in Heraklion Indoor Sports Arena, Crete. On June 14, 2019, Antetokounmpo was crowned Greek Basket League champion with Panathinaikos, for a second year in a row, after they swept Promitheas in the league finals.

Milwaukee Bucks (2019–present)
On July 16, 2019, Antetokounmpo signed with the Milwaukee Bucks, reuniting with his brother Giannis, also becoming the second pair of brothers on the Bucks roster, after twins Brook and Robin Lopez. He saw his first action in the closing minutes of a game against the Orlando Magic on November 1. Along with two assists and a rebound, the elder Antetokounmpo scored on a spectacular dunk. On November 13, 2019, The Milwaukee Bucks announced Antetokounmpo was sent to the Wisconsin Herd of the NBA G League. He was recalled two days later after one game with the Herd.

On July 20, 2021, Antetokounmpo won the 2021 NBA Finals with the Milwaukee Bucks. He had missed Games 5 and 6 of the Finals after entering the NBA's COVID-19 protocol. On August 13, Antetokounmpo re-signed with the Bucks on a two-year deal.

On April 10, 2022, Antetokounmpo recorded a career-high 27 points in his team's 115–133 loss to the Cleveland Cavaliers; in the same game, he achieved 41 minutes played, 5 rebounds , 2 assists, and 1 block.

National team career
On May 3, 2016, Antetokounmpo was named in the senior Nigerian men's national team training camp preliminary list for the 2016 Rio Olympics. He declined the offer, choosing instead to play with the senior Greek national team. He was selected to Greece's 12-man roster for the 2016 Turin FIBA World Olympic Qualifying Tournament. He next played with Greece at the EuroBasket 2017. He also played with Greece at the 2019 FIBA World Cup qualification.

Career statistics

NBA

Regular season

|-
| align="left" | 
| align="left" | New York
| 2 || 0 || 3.0 || .750 || .000 || .000 || .5 || .0 || .0 || .0 || 3.0
|-
| align="left" | 
| align="left" | Milwaukee
| 20 || 2 || 6.5 || .500 || .000 || .412 || 1.2 || .8 || .4 || .1 || 2.8
|-
| style="text-align:left;background:#afe6ba;"|†
| align="left" | Milwaukee
| 57 || 3 || 9.7 || .489 || .241 || .510 || 2.2 || .8 || .4 || .2 || 2.9
|-
| align="left" | 
| align="left" | Milwaukee
| 48 || 6 || 9.9 || .547 || .143 || .630 || 2.1 || .5 || .3 || .3 || 3.6
|- class="sortbottom"
| style="text-align:center;" colspan="2"| Career
| 127 || 11 || 9.1 || .517 || .167 || .545 || 2.0 || .7 || .4 || .2 || 3.1

Playoffs

|-
| style="text-align:left;background:#afe6ba;"| 2021†
| align="left" | Milwaukee
| 13 || 0 || 3.5 || .286 || — || .833 || .8 || .2 || .4 || .2 || .7
|-
| align="left" | 2022
| align="left" | Milwaukee
| 8 || 0 || 2.5 || .667 || — || .333 || .5 || .1 || .1 || .0 || .6
|- class="sortbottom"
| style="text-align:center;" colspan="2"| Career
| 21 || 0 || 3.1 || .400 || — || .667 || .7 || .2 || .3 || .1 || .7

EuroLeague

|-
| align="left" | 2017–18
| align="left" rowspan=2| Panathinaikos
| 33 || 26 || 11.3 || .528 || .286 || .583 || 2.2 || .4 || .3 || .3 || 3.6 || 3.8
|-
| align="left" | 2018–19 
| 29 || 9 || 12.1 || .593 || .318 || .448 || 1.8 || .3 || .7 || .3 || 4.2 || 3.9
|- class="sortbottom"
| style="text-align:center;" colspan="2"| Career
| 62 || 35 || 11.7 || .560 || .306 || .523 || 2.0 || .3 || .5 || .3 || 3.9 || 3.8

Personal life

Antetokounmpo was born in Athens, Greece, to Nigerian parents, and grew up in the Athens neighborhood of Sepolia. His late father, Charles, was a former Nigerian association football player, while his mother, Veronica, is a former high-jumper. His parents are from different Nigerian ethnic groups—Charles was Yoruba, and Veronica is Igbo. He officially gained Greek citizenship on May 9, 2013, with the official legal spelling of his last name being Antetokounmpo. His oldest brother, Francis, is a professional football (soccer) player.

His younger brother, Giannis Antetokounmpo (b. 1994), was drafted 15th overall in the 2013 NBA draft by the Milwaukee Bucks. With Giannis known as "The Greek Freak", Thanasis was sometimes referred to as "Greek Freak 2", although his own nickname was "The Greek Streak". In addition, he's also the older brother of Kostas and Alexis, both of whom also trained with Filathlitikos. Antetokounmpo's mother gave each of her four sons born in Greece, both a Greek and a Nigerian name. Kostas is a member of ASVEL Basket  in LNB Pro A, while Alex graduated from Dominican High School.

In 2017, during the EuroBasket tournament in Helsinki, in which the senior Greek national team was competing, he was nicknamed "The Elevator" by Greek basketball sportscaster Vangelis Ioannou, as well as by his younger brother, Giannis. This nickname was given to him due to his superb jumping ability.

Notes

References

External links

 
 Thanasis Antetokounmpo  at acb.com 
 Thanasis Antetokounmpo at basket.gr 
 Thanasis Antetokounmpo at draftexpress.com
 Thanasis Antetokounmpo at euroleague.net
 Thanasis Antetokounmpo at nbadleague.com
 

1992 births
Living people
2019 FIBA Basketball World Cup players
BC Andorra players
Delaware 87ers players
EFAO Zografou B.C. players
Greek Basket League players
Greek expatriate basketball people in Andorra
Greek expatriate basketball people in the United States
Greek expatriate sportspeople in the United States
Greek men's basketball players
Greek people of Nigerian descent
Greek people of Igbo descent
Greek people of Yoruba descent
Greek emigrants to the United States
Naturalized citizens of Greece
Naturalized citizens of the United States
Igbo sportspeople
Liga ACB players
Milwaukee Bucks players
National Basketball Association players from Greece
New York Knicks draft picks
New York Knicks players
Panathinaikos B.C. players
Players drafted from the NBA Development League
Power forwards (basketball)
Shooting guards
Small forwards
Basketball players from Athens
Westchester Knicks players
Wisconsin Herd players
Yoruba sportspeople
Antetokounmpo family